Shilpa Raju is an Indian playback singer, working in the Malayalam film industry.

Early life 

Shilpa was born to C. R. Raju and Geetha Raju in Kadamattom (Ernakulam district) on 27 June 1992. She started learning music at age 7. She completed her bachelor's degree in English Language and Literature from St. Peter's College, Kolenchery.

During her school days, she entered music contests. She was a frequent participant in school youth festivals, winning multiple prizes.

Contests 

She was the M.G. University arts fest winner in 2011 and 2012 for light music and Kavithaparayanam, respectively. In 2002, she participated in Twinkle Stars, a musical contest in Jeevan, winning first prize. In 2007, she participated in Ragalayam, a music contest on Surya and was first runner up. In 2010 she participated in Idea Star Singer Season 5 and was one of the top ten contestants. Reality shows 2007 - Little Masters on Asianet Plus - 1st Runner Up. 2008 - Gandharvasangeetham on Kairali TV - 3rd Runner Up. 2010 - Idea Star Singer on Asianet .

She was a finalist in the Asianet Idea Star Singer 2011–12 season. She got her chance at stardom in Mollywood with a duet in the movie, Just Married.

References 

1992 births
Living people
Malayalam playback singers
Singers from Kochi
Indian women playback singers
21st-century Indian women singers
21st-century Indian singers